LFB may refer to:

 London Fire Brigade, the fire and rescue service for London
 L. Frank Baum, author of The Wizard of Oz
 Lachlan Fold Belt, a geological feature in Australia
 Laissez Faire Books, a bookseller in New York
 Lausanne–Fribourg–Bern Railway, a Swiss railway company
 Leaf-Footed Bugs, a large group of insects from the family Coreidae
 Liga Femenina de Baloncesto, the Spanish women's basketball league
 Ligue féminine de basket, French women's basketball league
 Lillesand–Flaksvand Line, a railway line in Norway
 Louisiana Farm Bureau Federation
 Luxembourg for Business, trade promotion body of the Luxembourg government
 Luxol fast blue stain, a stain used in biology
 Line Fill Buffer, part of a CPU Cache for assembling a cache line after a cache miss
 Lycée Français de Bakou, a French international school in Baku, Azerbaijan
 Lycée Français de Bali, a French international school in Bali, Indonesia
 Lycée Français de Barcelone or the Liceo Francés de Barcelona, a French international school in Barcelona, Spain
 French Lycée in Brussels (Lycée Français Jean Monnet de Bruxelles), a French school in Belgium
 Gustave Eiffel French School of Budapest (Lycée Français de Budapest), a French international school in Budapest, Hungary